"The One I'm Running To" is a song by Christian rock band 7eventh Time Down from their second album, Just Say Jesus. It was released in 2014 as the album's final single.

Charts

2013 songs
Tooth & Nail Records singles
7eventh Time Down songs
Songs written by Tony Wood (musician)
Songs written by Ian Eskelin